Safa Ishan (also Romanized as Şafā Īshān) is a village in Jafarbay-ye Gharbi Rural District, Gomishan District, Torkaman County, Golestan Province, Iran. At the 2006 census, its population was 389, in 77 families.

References 

Populated places in Torkaman County